Robert South Barrett IV (1927 – December 24, 2004) was an American Career Foreign Service Officer who served concurrent appointments as Chargé d'Affaires ad interim to Madagascar and Comoros (1977-1980) and was Ambassador Extraordinary and Plenipotentiary to Djibouti (1988-1991).  He also served as “Consul in Martinique, political officer in war-torn Vietnam, ... and Deputy Chief of Mission in conflict-ravaged Beirut, with a relatively peaceful interim tour at the United Nations in New York, before accepting the post of Ambassador to Djibouti, a country of great strategic importance to the United States”

Barrett graduated with an AB was in politics from Princeton University and a master's in economics from the University of Wisconsin–Madison.

A resident of Washington, DC and Charleston, South Carolina, Barrett died of cancer at Georgetown University Hospital.

References

1927 births
2004 deaths
Princeton University alumni
University of Wisconsin–Madison College of Letters and Science alumni
Ambassadors of the United States to Djibouti
People from Washington, D.C.
People from Charleston, South Carolina
Ambassadors of the United States to Madagascar
Ambassadors of the United States to the Comoros
20th-century American diplomats